Achtung Panzer: Kharkov 1943 is a 2010 real-time strategy video game developed by Ukrainian studio Graviteam and published by Paradox Interactive.

Reception

Achtung Panzer: Kharkov 1943 received mixed reviews from critics upon release. On Metacritic, the game holds a score of 70/100 based on 6 reviews, indicating "mixed or average reviews". On GameRankings, the game holds a score of 80.00% based on 5 reviews.

References

See also
Wargame (video games)
List of Paradox Interactive games
List of PC games
2010 in video gaming

2010 video games
Real-time strategy video games
Video games developed in Ukraine
Windows games
Windows-only games
World War II video games
Paradox Interactive games